Cycas circinalis, also known as the queen sago, is a species of cycad known in the wild only from southern India. Cycas circinalis is the only gymnosperm species found among native Sri Lankan flora.

Taxonomy
C. circinallis is native to southern India and Sri Lanka, but the species name was formerly widely used for similar cycads in Southeast Asia, which leads to confusion in modern sources. The specimens described as "C. circinallis" in Indonesia and New Guinea is now recognized as Cycas rumphii; while the taxon formerly described as the subspecies C. circinallis ssp. riuminiana from the Philippines is now regarded as a separate species, Cycas riuminiana.

Cultivation
The plant is widely cultivated in Hawaii, both for its appearance in landscape and interiors, and for cut foliage.

Use as food
The seed is poisonous. The potent poison in the seeds is removed by soaking them in water. Water from the first seed-soaking will kill birds, goats, sheep and hogs. Water from the following soakings is said to be harmless. [Minimum of 5 Soakings needed to ensure the safety]

After the final soaking, the seeds are dried and ground into flour. The flour is used to make tortillas, tamales, soup and porridge.

Lytico-bodig disease 
The plant was thought to be linked with the degenerative disease lytico-bodig on the island of Guam; however, the cycad native to Guam has since been recognised as a separate species, Cycas micronesica, by K.D. Hill in 1994.

Chemistry 
Leaflets of C. circinalis contain biflavonoids such as (2S, 2′′S)-2,3,2′′,3′′-tetrahydro-4′,4′′′-di-O-methylamentoflavone (tetrahydroisoginkgetin).

References

External links
 Floridata: Cycas circinalis
 EDIS: Queen sago
 USDA Plants Profile
 University of Hawai'i at Manoa: King and Queen Sago

circinalis
Non-timber forest products
Plants described in 1753
Taxa named by Carl Linnaeus
Flora of India (region)